The 1999–2000 Slovak Extraliga season was the seventh season of the Slovak Extraliga, the top level of ice hockey in Slovakia. Eight teams participated in the league, and HC Slovan Bratislava won the championship.

Standings

Playoffs

Semifinals

 HC Slovan Bratislava - Dukla Trenčín 3:0  (10:2, 2:0, 2:1)
 HKm Zvolen - HK ŠKP Poprad 3:2  (0:2, 5:2, 4:1, 0:5, 3:0)

Final 

 HC Slovan Bratislava - HKm Zvolen 3:2  (0:1, 5:1, 2:3, 3:1, 8:1)

Third place 

 Dukla Trenčín - HK ŠKP Poprad 2:0  (6:4, 3:1)

External links
 Slovak Ice Hockey Federation

Slovak Extraliga seasons
Slov
Slovak

de:Extraliga (Slowakei) 2001/02